The uninhabited Point Islands are located in Hudson Strait's Diana Bay. Though they are near the Inuit hamlet of Quaqtaq, Quebec, they are part of the Qikiqtaaluk Region, in the Canadian territory of Nunavut.

References 

Islands of Hudson Strait
Uninhabited islands of Qikiqtaaluk Region